FF Aquilae is a classical Cepheid variable star located in the constellation Aquila. It ranges from apparent magnitude 5.18 to 5.51 over a period of 4.470848 days, meaning it is faintly visible to the unaided eye in rural or suburban settings.

Originally known as HR 7165, it was noted to be variable by Charles Morse Huffer in August 1927, who observed its Cepheid pattern. It then received the variable star designation FF Aquilae. It is a small amplitude classical Cepheid, and as such is expected to be a supergiant near the red edge of the instability strip.

A yellow supergiant, FF Aqlilae pulsates with varying temperature, diameter, and luminosity.  It has been estimated to be  distant from Earth by extrapolating from its angular diameter and estimated radius.

FF Aquilae is a possible quadruple star system.  Analysis of its spectrum shows that it is a spectroscopic binary system with the fainter companion calculated to be a main sequence star of spectral type A9V to F3V, orbiting every 3.92 years.  A third star, revealed by speckle interferometry, is likely to be a cooler star that has evolved off the main sequence. A fourth star, that is of magnitude 11.4 and located 6 arcseconds away, is a somewhat evolved star slightly hotter, larger, and more luminous than the Sun.  Several studies found it unlikely to be a member of the system, although Gaia Data Release 3 finds it to be at a similar distance and with a similar proper motion.

References

Aquila (constellation)
176155
Classical Cepheid variables
Aquilae, FF
F-type supergiants
7165
093124
Durchmusterung objects
A-type main-sequence stars